Maple Lawn Farm is a historic home located at Newark Valley in Tioga County, New York. The frame house was constructed in the 1880s in the Stick Style.  It consists of a -story T-shaped section on the east, a 2-story rear wing, and a 1-story modern addition.  Also on the property is a bank barn built in three stages with sections dating to the early or mid 19th century.

It was listed on the National Register of Historic Places in 1997.

References

Houses on the National Register of Historic Places in New York (state)
Queen Anne architecture in New York (state)
Houses in Tioga County, New York
National Register of Historic Places in Tioga County, New York